Ib Penick (1930–1998), a native of Denmark, was known as "the creative mind behind the resurgence of pop-up children's books in the 1960s and 1970s. In his career, Penick designed more than 130 children's books, including Star Wars: a Pop-up Book, which sold more than a million copies. Penick related to one reporter, "...there are only about 100 folds and tricks to [his paper engineering] trade. It's like playing a piano. You have only a certain number of keys, but it's the combinations that make the difference."

Biography
In the 1960s Penick joined Waldo Hunt at Graphics International, a firm that created pop-up books, including a series of titles for Random House and other publishers.  Penick was the "premier paper engineer" for the Random House pop-up titles, and Tor Lokvig was his protege. According to Gerald Harrison, a former president of the children's books division at Random House, Penick "was really responsible for creating the whole world we lived in. With the advent of the Random House line, a whole industry was created and the very first ones were created by Ib."

Penick and Hunt later sold Graphics International to Hallmark Cards in 1966.

Selected bibliography
The following is a sample of the pop-up books paper engineered by Ib Penick:

Patents
Penick held several patents in the area of paper engineering, camera design and packaging, including:
 – Decorative paperboard boxes
 – Item with pivoting pop-up
 – Method of making hinged pop-up items
 – Pop-ups and methods of making
 – Promotional pop-up and method of making
 – Paper pop-up devices and method of making the same
 – Camera with improved shutter arrangement
 – Disposable Camera
 – Pocket sized camera

References

1930 births
1998 deaths
Children's books
Pop-up book artists
Danish emigrants to the United States